Adelin Valentin Voinescu (born 1 April 1998) is a Romanian professional footballer who plays as a forward. In his career, Voinescu played mostly at the level of Liga III, for teams such as Atletic Bradu, Național Sebiș or Unirea Bascov.

References

External links
 
 
 Adelin Voinescu at frf-ajf.ro

1998 births
Living people
Sportspeople from Pitești
Romanian footballers
Association football forwards
Liga I players
Liga II players
Liga III players
FC Argeș Pitești players
CS Național Sebiș players
FC Voluntari players
AFC Dacia Unirea Brăila players